Povolnya platycosma is a moth of the family Gracillariidae. It is known from Sri Lanka.

The larvae feed on Litsea glutinosa. They mine the leaves of their host plant.

References
Meyrick, E. 1912b. Lepidoptera Heterocera (Tineae). Fam. Gracilariadae. In: Wytsman, P. (ed.): Genera Insectorum. Fascicule 128. - — :1–36, pl. 1.

Gracillariidae
Moths described in 1912
Moths of Sri Lanka